Jules Favre (6 November 1882, Le Locle – 22 January 1959, Geneva) was a Swiss zoologist, mycologist and geologist. He was curator at the Natural History Museum of Geneva from 1915 to 1952.

He studied natural sciences at the Neuchâtel Academy, and in 1907, started work as an assistant at the Muséum d'Histoire Naturelle in Geneva, where he eventually became a curator of geology and paleontology. In 1952 he received an honorary degree from the University of Neuchâtel.

During his career, he was a recipient of the Prix Desmazières of the Académie des sciences of Paris and the Prix de la Ville de Genève. In 1927 he became a member of the Société linnéenne de Lyon (Linnean Society of Lyon).

His type material is stored in the collections at the Muséum d'Histoire Naturelle in Geneva, and some material is kept in the Melvill-Tomlin collection at the National Museum of Wales, Cardiff.

Published works
Partial list:
 1911.  
 1913. 
 1914. Carte du Salève (Haute-Savoie), 1/25.000. Dressée d'après des levés photogrammétriques et barométriques et des croquis pris sur place avec E. Joukowsky.
 1927. Les mollusques post-glaciaires et actuels du bassin de Genève.
 1935. Histoire malacologique du lac de Genève. In: Mémoires de la Société physique et d'Histoire naturelle de Genève.
 1941. Les Pisidium du canton de Neuchatel. In: Bulletin de la société neuchateloise des sciences, T. 66.
 1945. Études mycologiques faites au Parc national suisse.
 1955. 
 1960. Catalogue descriptif des champignons supérieurs de la zone subalpine du Parc national suisse.
Books about Jules Favre:
 1959. "L'œuvre mycologique de Jules Favre", Lons-le-Saunier : M. Declume, 1959. by Henri Romagnesi. and in: Bulletin de la Société Mycologique de France 75, 1959, 418-426.

References
 Turner, H., J. G. J. Kuiper, N. Thew, R. Bernasconi, J. Rüetschi, M. Wütrich & M. Gosteli, 1998 Kurze Erforschungsgeschichte der Weichtiere der Schweiz / Historique abrégé de la recherche malacologique en Suisse. pp. 9–19, In: Atlas der Mollusken der Schweiz und Liechtensteins. Fauna Helvetica 2, 527 pp., Neuchâtel. Biography, portrait

20th-century Swiss geologists
19th-century Swiss zoologists
1882 births
1959 deaths
Swiss malacologists
Swiss mycologists
Swiss taxonomists
People from Le Locle
19th-century Swiss geologists
19th-century Swiss botanists
20th-century Swiss botanists
20th-century Swiss zoologists